Canaan ( – Kənáʿan, in pausa  – Kənā́ʿan), according to the Book of Genesis in the Hebrew Bible, was a son of Ham and grandson of Noah, as well as the father of the Canaanites.

Etymology 
The English term Canaan (pronounced  since c. AD 1500, due to the Great Vowel Shift) comes from the Hebrew  (knʿn), via Greek  Khanaan and Latin . It first occurs in Greek in the writings of Hecataeus as Khna(Χνᾶ).

The etymology is uncertain. One explanation is that it has an original meaning of "lowlands", from a Semitic root  "to be low, humble, depressed", in contrast with Aram, "highlands". An alternative suggestion derives the term from Hurrian Kinahhu, purportedly referring to the colour purple, so that Canaan and Phoenicia would be synonyms ("Land of Purple"), but it is just as common to assume that Kinahhu was simply the Hurrian rendition of the Semitic .

Descendants of Canaan

According to the Table of Nations in Genesis 10 (verses 15–19), Canaan was the ancestor of the tribes who originally occupied the ancient Land of Canaan: all the territory from Sidon or Hamath in the north to Gaza in the southwest and Lasha in the southeast. This territory, known as the Levant, is roughly the areas of modern-day Israel, Palestine, Lebanon, western Jordan, and western Syria.  Canaan's firstborn son was Sidon, who shares his name with the Phoenician city of Sidon in present-day Lebanon. His second son was Heth. Canaan's descendants, according to the Hebrew Bible, include:

 Sidonians
 Hittites, children of Heth
 Jebusites
 Amorites
 Girgashites
 Hivites
 Arkites
 Sinites
 Arvadites
 Zemarites
 Hamathites

According to traditional Ethiopian histories, Canaan's son Arwadi (lit. "the Arvadite") and his wife Entela crossed from Asia into Ethiopia in 2101 BC, and the Qemant tribe were said to be descended from their son, Anayer. There is further an Ethiopian tradition that two other Canaanite tribes, viz. the Sinites and Zemarites, also entered Ethiopia at the time it was ruled by the Kingdom of Kush, and became the Shanqella and Weyto peoples, respectively. The Qemant relate that they share their Canaanite origin with the other Agaw groups. The Omotic speaking Shinasha have a similar tradition of descent from Canaan's son Hamati Similarly, the Shinasha extend the Canaanite ancestry to neighboring ethnic groups 
The Persian historian Muhammad ibn Jarir al-Tabari (c. 915) recounted a tradition that the wife of Canaan was named Arsal, a daughter of Batawil son of Tiras, and that she bore him the "Blacks, Nubians, Fezzan, Zanj, Zaghawah, and all the peoples of the Sudan." Likewise, Abd al Hakam tells that "Canaan is the father of the Sudan (Sub Saharan Africans) and the Abyssinians".

The German historian Johannes Aventinus (fl. c. 1525) recorded a legend that Canaan's sons the "Arkite" and the "Hamathite" first settled in the area of Greece, and gave their names to the regions of Arcadia and Emathia.

Curse of Canaan

This is the Curse of Canaan, erroneously called the "Curse of Ham" since Classical antiquity because of the interpretation that Canaan was punished for his father Ham's sins. However, there are interpretations that Canaan was the sole sinner himself. The sin in question is debated, ranging from literal voyeurism, castration or incestuous rape. 

Ham's transgression:
And Ham, the father of Canaan, saw the nakedness of his father, and told his two brethren without. (Genesis 9:22)
Genesis 9:24–27
24 And Noah awoke from his wine, and knew what his younger son had done unto him.
25 And he said, Cursed [be] Canaan; a servant of servants shall he be unto his brethren.
26 And he said, Blessed [be] the  God of Shem; and Canaan shall be his servant.
27 God shall enlarge Japheth, and he shall dwell in the tents of Shem; and Canaan shall be his servant.
(—Authorized King James Version)

Some modern scholars view the curse of Canaan in Genesis 9:20–27 as an early Hebrew rationalization for Israel's conquest of Canaan. When Noah cursed Canaan in Genesis 9:25, he used the expression "Cursed be Canaan; A servant of servants He shall be to his brethren."NKJV The expression "servant of servants", otherwise translated "slave of slaves",NIV emphasizes the extreme degree of servitude that Canaan will experience in relation to his "brothers". In the subsequent passage, "of Shem... may Canaan be his servant,"[9:26] the narrator is foreshadowing Israel's conquest of the promised land. Biblical scholar Philip R. Davies explains that the author of this narrative used Noah to curse Canaan, in order to provide justification for the later Israelites driving out and enslaving the Canaanites.

See also
 Canaan, the location
 Canaanites, its historical inhabitants
 Generations of Noah

References

Bibliography

External links
 Encyclopædia Britannica Online Article (subscription/registration required)

Book of Genesis people
Children of Ham (son of Noah)
Legendary progenitors
Noach (parashah)

ca:Llista de personatges bíblics#Canaan
Mythological rapists